The 2009 Jade Solid Gold Best Ten Music Awards Presentation (Chinese: 2009年度十大勁歌金曲頒獎典禮) was held on January 16, 2010 at the Kowloon Hong Kong Coliseum. It is part of the Jade Solid Gold Best Ten Music Awards Presentation series.

Special situation
This award was particularly controversial with the ongoing HKRIA tax case. Singers from Sony Music, Universal Music and Warner Music Group were not allowed to attend this award show.  As a result, the majority of awards went to singers from EEG and other smaller companies.

EMI also no longer represent any local HK singers, since Gold Typhoon took over the domestic division.  EMI HK is now present as a copyright agency.

Top 10 song awards
The top 10 songs (十大勁歌金曲) of 2009 are as follows.

Additional awards

References
 B.tvb.com

Cantopop
Jade Solid Gold Best Ten Music Awards Presentation, 2009